Big Lake is a lake in Grant County, in the U.S. state of Minnesota.

Big Lake was named for its relatively large size.

See also
List of lakes in Minnesota

References

Lakes of Minnesota
Lakes of Grant County, Minnesota